A general election was held in the U.S. state of Wyoming on Tuesday, November 2, 1954. All of the state's executive officers—the governor, secretary of state, auditor, treasurer, and superintendent of public instruction—were up for election. The result was largely a continuation of Republican rule, though Democrat Velma Linford won the election for Superintendent and the margins in most of the other races shrunk considerably from 1950.

Governor

Following Governor Frank A. Barrett's election to the U.S. Senate in 1952, Republican secretary of state Doc Rogers became acting governor. He ran for re-election, but was defeated by former state representative Milward Simpson in the Republican primary. In the general election, Simpson then narrowly defeated William M. Jack, the former secretary of state and state auditor.

Secretary of state
Incumbent Republican secretary of state Doc Rogers simultaneously served as acting Governor following Governor Frank A. Barrett's election to the U.S. Senate in 1952, and opted to run for re-election as Governor rather than for re-election as secretary of state. State Auditor Everett T. Copenhaver ran for secretary of state, and won the Republican primary unopposed. In the general election, he faced Zan Lewis, a former aide to Senator Lester C. Hunt and the longtime chief clerk in the secretary of state's office. Copenhaver was able to build on his record of electoral victories and defeated Lewis in a landslide, and was the strongest performing statewide candidate that year.

Democratic primary

Candidates
 Zan Lewis, former legislative aide to U.S. Senator Lester C. Hunt, chief clerk in the secretary of state's office
 Archie Ewoldsen, Secretary of the Sheridan Chamber of Commerce, former Public Service Commissioner

Results

Republican primary

Candidates
 Everett T. Copenhaver, Wyoming State Auditor

Results

General election

Results

Auditor
Incumbent Republican state auditor Everett T. Copenhaver opted against seeking a third term, instead running for secretary of state. Accordingly, State Treasurer Minnie A. Mitchell, barred from seeking a second term as treasurer, ran for auditor. She defeated Rusty Rothwell, secretary to the State Board of Charities and Reform, in the Republican primary and then faced Democratic nominee Bob Adams, a real estate broker, in the general election.

Democratic primary

Candidates
 Bob Adams, Cheyenne real estate broker
 Adam Roney, former Mayor of Powell

Results

Republican primary

Candidates
 Minnie A. Mitchell, Wyoming State Treasurer
 E. C. "Rusty" Rothwell, secretary to the State Board of Charities and Reform

Results

General election

Results

Treasurer
Incumbent Republican state treasurer Minnie A. Mitchell, appointed to the post following the death of her husband in 1952, was barred from seeking re-election due to term limits. Charles B. Morgan, who served as deputy state treasurer for 41 years and to 12 different state treasurers, won the Republican primary over Insurance Commissioner Ford S. Taft. In the general election, he faced former state representative W. D. "Jud" Witherspoon, the Democratic nominee, whom he narrowly defeated.

Democratic primary

Candidates
 W. D. "Jud" Witherspoon, former state representative from Lincoln County

Results

Republican primary

Candidates
 Charles B. Morgan, deputy state treasurer
 Ford S. Taft, state insurance commissioner

Results

General election

Results

Superintendent of public instruction
Incumbent Republican superintendent of public instruction Edna B. Stolt declined to run for re-election to a third term. State Education Commissioner Ray Robertson won the Republican nomination to succeed Stolt unopposed and faced Velma Linford, the 1946 nominee for superintendent. In the Democratic Party's only pickup of a state executive office, Linford narrowly defeated Robertson to win her first term.

Democratic primary

Candidates
 Velma Linford, Laramie High School teacher, 1946 Democratic nominee for Superintendent

Results

Republican primary

Candidates
 Ray E. Robertson, State Education Commissioner

Results

General election

Results

References

 
Wyoming